Hans-Peter Zaugg, (born 2 December 1952), is a Swiss football manager and former player. He is often referred to by his nickname, "Bidu."

Career
A midfielder, Zaugg played for FC Rot-Weiss Bümpliz, Neuchâtel Xamax and FC Bern. After taking up coaching he coached at various Swiss clubs until 1990, when he became a youth coach in the Swiss Football Association. Two years later, Zaugg also joined the Switzerland senior team as an assistant coach, a position he held until 1999, when he became caretaker of the national side, following Gilbert Gress' resignation in a dispute over salary. From 2000 to 2005, Zaugg then coached at Grasshopper Club Zurich, FC Luzern and BSC Young Boys.

In December 2006, Zaugg was named manager of the Liechtenstein national team succeeding Martin Andermatt. Zaugg and the LFV cancelled the contract in a mutual agreement by 31 December 2012.

References

Living people
1952 births
Footballers from Bern
Swiss men's footballers
Association football midfielders
Neuchâtel Xamax FCS players
FC Bern players
Swiss football managers
Switzerland national football team managers
Grasshopper Club Zürich managers
FC Luzern managers
BSC Young Boys managers
Liechtenstein national football team managers
Swiss expatriate football managers
Swiss expatriate sportspeople in Liechtenstein
Expatriate football managers in Liechtenstein
Swiss Challenge League managers
Swiss Super League managers